Alex Barnes may refer to:

Alex Barnes (American football) (born 1996), American football player
Alex Barnes, a founder of the film production company Silver Screen Pictures